Wesley Owen "Lee" Bales (born December 4, 1944) is an American former professional second baseman who played six seasons in  Major League Baseball (MLB). His career, which lasted from 1963 to 1968, included 31 games played for the Atlanta Braves and the Houston Astros. The Braves signed him as a free agent in 1963. He graduated from Norwalk High School and attended Cerritos College and California State University, Long Beach.

Bales' two partial seasons in MLB were marred by offensive struggles. In 53 plate appearances, he mustered only four hits, all singles, along with eight bases on balls, one sacrifice bunt and one sacrifice fly. He had two runs batted in. Defensively, he started eight games at second base and played 82 of his total of 92 big-league innings at the "keystone sack." He made one error in 46 chances, for a .978 fielding percentage.

He now lives with his wife in Houston, Texas.

External links

Lee Bales at SABR (Baseball BioProject)
Lee Bales at Pura Pelota (Venezuelan Professional Baseball League)

1944 births
Living people
Amarillo Sonics players
Atlanta Braves players
Atlanta Crackers players
Austin Senators players
Baseball players from Los Angeles
Boise Braves players
Cardenales de Lara players
American expatriate baseball players in Venezuela
Cerritos Falcons baseball players
Dallas–Fort Worth Spurs players
Houston Astros players
Long Beach State Dirtbags baseball players
Major League Baseball second basemen
Oklahoma City 89ers players
Richmond Braves players